Olga Ruyol (born 10 August 1968) is a Cuban softball player. She competed in the women's tournament at the 2000 Summer Olympics.

References

External links
 

1968 births
Living people
Cuban softball players
Olympic softball players of Cuba
Softball players at the 2000 Summer Olympics
Place of birth missing (living people)
Pan American Games medalists in softball
Pan American Games bronze medalists for Cuba
Medalists at the 1991 Pan American Games